Autoeroticism or autosexuality is a practice of sexually stimulating oneself, especially one's own body through accumulation of internal stimuli.

The term was popularized toward the end of the 19th century by British sexologist Havelock Ellis, who defined autoeroticism as "the phenomena of spontaneous sexual emotion generated in the absence of an external stimulus proceeding, directly or indirectly, from another person".

The most common autoerotic practice is masturbation. Though the terms autoeroticism and masturbation are often used interchangeably, they are not synonymous as not all autoerotic behaviors are masturbatory. Nocturnal emissions, erotic daydreams, and sexual arousal to 'sexually-neutral' stimuli (music, scenery, art, risk, spiritual reverie, etc.) are also examples of autoeroticism.

Terminology and concept
A 1977 paper titled Asexual and Autoerotic Women: Two Invisible Groups, by Myra T. Johnson, contrasts autoerotic women with asexual women: "The asexual woman ... has no sexual desires at all [but] the autoerotic woman ... recognizes such desires but prefers to satisfy them alone." Johnson's evidence is mostly letters to the editor found in women's magazines written by autoerotic/asexual women. She portrays them as invisible, "oppressed by a consensus that they are nonexistent," and left behind by both the sexual revolution and the feminist movement. Society either ignores or denies their existence or insists they must be ascetic for religious reasons, neurotic, or asexual for political reasons.

Self-stimulation 
Some people use sex toys such as dildos, vibrators, anal beads and Sybian machines while alone. Autocunnilingus remains unproved but autofellatio, the act of orally stimulating one's own penis, is thought to occur in less than 1% of the male population, possibly because of the physical flexibility required to perform it.

Criticism and controversies 
Some people, for religious or personal reasons, disapprove of autoeroticism on moral grounds. For example, masturbation is considered a sin by the Roman Catholic Church. Teaching adolescents about masturbation remains controversial in some parts of the world. For example, in 1994 Bill Clinton fired Surgeon General Joycelyn Elders in part because she advocated teaching about masturbation in schools as a way of preventing teenage pregnancy and sexually transmitted diseases.

Safety 
A few autoerotic practices are considered unsafe, and sometimes even lead to death. These include autoerotic asphyxiation and self-bondage. The potential for injury or even death that exists while engaging in these practices rather than the partnered versions (erotic asphyxiation and bondage, respectively) becomes drastically increased due to the isolation and lack of assistance in the event of a problem.

In other animal species 

Autoerotic behavior has been observed in many species, both in the wild and in captivity. Individuals of some species, such as apes and dolphins, have been known to create tools for autoerotic purposes.

Increase of autoeroticism during COVID-19 pandemic 
With the outbreak of COVID-19 pandemic and the subsequent worldwide lockdown starting in March 2020, there was an increase in autoerotic sexual practices of 40% according to a study done by International Journal of Impotence Research.

References

External links

 Autoerotic Behaviors and Patterns

Masturbation